The Rockets Hockey Club, or New Jersey Rockets, are a junior ice hockey organization from Bridgewater, New Jersey. They play in the National Collegiate Development Conference, Premier Division, and Elite Division of the United States Premier Hockey League (USPHL) at the Prudential Center, also home to the New Jersey Devils of the NHL. The organization's top Junior team played in the Atlantic Junior Hockey League (AJHL) from 2004 until it became the Eastern Hockey League (EHL) in 2013. In 2017, the Rockets' organization joined the USPHL. The players, ages 16–20, carry amateur status under Junior A guidelines and hope to earn a spot on higher levels of junior hockey in the United States and Canada, Canadian major junior, collegiate, and eventually professional teams.

The organization previously fielded a team at the Tier III former Junior B level in the Metropolitan Junior Hockey League (MJHL) and in the EHL-Elite Division. The organization also fields a women's team in the New England Women's Junior Hockey League (NEWJHL), and youth hockey select teams at the Midget U18, Midget 16U, Bantam, Peewee, and Squirt and Mite levels and girls teams at the U14, U16, and U19 levels.

Season-by-season records

Alumni
The Rockets have produced a number of alumni playing in higher levels of junior hockey, NCAA Division I, Division III college and professional programs, including:
 John Carlson — Washington Capitals 2008 NHL Entry Draft - Washington Capitals (NHL), Hershey Bears (AHL)
 David Kolomatis — Los Angeles Kings 2009 NHL Entry Draft - Manchester Monarchs (AHL)
 Brian Mullen — Winnipeg Jets 1980 NHL Entry Draft - New York Islanders (NHL)
 Jeremy Roenick — Chicago Blackhawks 1988 NHL Entry Draft - San Jose Sharks (NHL)
 Bobby Sanguinetti — New York Rangers 2006 NHL Entry Draft - New York Rangers (NHL)

References

External links
 NJ Rockets web site
 Official League Website

Sports in Newark, New Jersey
Ice hockey teams in New Jersey
Ice hockey clubs established in 1970
1970 establishments in New Jersey